The Wellesley College Tupelos are the oldest a cappella group at Wellesley College.  Founded in 1947, the group has performed throughout the Eastern United States. Their name allegedly came from Tupelo Point on Lake Waban on the college campus."

The Tupelos repertoire includes pop music, jazz, throwbacks, and traditional Wellesley songs. They have hosted guest groups at their performances  and competed at the collegiate level.

The Tupelos are known for their "Sunday Candy" mashup performance.  They have been featured on Acaville Radio.

References

External links 
 

Wellesley College
Collegiate a cappella groups